University was a station on the Chicago Transit Authority's Green Line; The station was located at 1200 East 63rd Street in the Woodlawn neighborhood of Chicago. University opened on April 23, 1893. From December 12, 1982, until January 9, 1994, University served as the terminal of the Jackson Park Branch. The station closed on January 9, 1994, when the entire Green Line closed for a renovation project. University did not reopen with the rest of the Green Line on May 12, 1996. University was scheduled to be replaced by a new terminal at Dorchester. Instead the line was cut back to its current terminal at Cottage Grove. The University station was demolished in September 1997 when the City of Chicago demolished the rest of the Jackson Park branch east of Cottage Grove.

References

CTA Green Line stations
Chicago "L" terminal stations
Defunct Chicago "L" stations
Railway stations in the United States opened in 1893
Railway stations closed in 1994
1893 establishments in Illinois
1994 disestablishments in Illinois
Former North Shore Line stations